Þorvaldsson is a surname of Icelandic origin, meaning son of Þorvaldur. In Icelandic names, the name is not strictly a surname, but a patronymic. The name refers to:
Einar Thorvaldsson (1902–1967), Icelandic chess master
Gissur Þorvaldsson (1208–1268), Icelandic chieftain, goði of the Haukdælir family clan
Gunnar Heiðar Þorvaldsson (b. 1982), Icelandic professional football player
Sigurður Þorvaldsson (b. 1980), Icelandic professional basketball player

Icelandic-language surnames